The following is a list of feature films produced and distributed by the American studio Columbia Pictures from 1940 until 1949. During these years Columbia was one of the eight major studios of Hollywood. Production was overseen during the decade by studio head Harry Cohn.

1940

1941

1942

1943

1944

1945

1946

1947

1948

1949

See also
 List of Columbia Pictures films

References

Bibliography
 Blottner, Gene. Columbia Pictures Movie Series, 1926-1955: The Harry Cohn Years. McFarland, 2011.
 Christensen, Jens. Global Experience Industries. ISD LLC, 2009.
 Dick, Bernard F. The Merchant Prince of Poverty Row: Harry Cohn of Columbia Pictures. University Press of Kentucky, 2014.

1940
American films by studio
Sony Pictures Entertainment Motion Picture Group